Yury Sharov (22 April 1939 – 12 December 2021) was a Soviet fencer. He won a gold medal in the team foil event at the 1964 Summer Olympics and a silver in the same event at the 1968 Summer Olympics. 

Sharov died on 12 December 2021, at the age of 82.

References

External links
 

1939 births
2021 deaths
Russian male fencers
Soviet male fencers
Olympic fencers of the Soviet Union
Fencers at the 1964 Summer Olympics
Fencers at the 1968 Summer Olympics
Olympic gold medalists for the Soviet Union
Olympic silver medalists for the Soviet Union
Sportspeople from Saratov
Olympic medalists in fencing
Medalists at the 1964 Summer Olympics
Medalists at the 1968 Summer Olympics